Green Hill is a historic plantation house located at Virginia Beach, Virginia.  It was built about 1791, and is a two-story, five bay, double pile, Georgian / Federal style brick dwelling. Two two-story wings were added in 1954.

It was added to the National Register of Historic Places in 2013.

References

Plantation houses in Virginia
Houses on the National Register of Historic Places in Virginia
Georgian architecture in Virginia
Federal architecture in Virginia
Houses completed in 1791
Houses in Virginia Beach, Virginia
National Register of Historic Places in Virginia Beach, Virginia